Toondahra is a rural locality in the North Burnett Region, Queensland, Australia.

Geography 
There are a number of mountains in Toondahra:

 Messmate Mountain, 
 Mount Barbara, 
 Mount Lorna, 
 Pipe Clay Hill,

History
The locality was named and bounded on 10 September 1999.

Mount Barbara was named to commemorate the late Mrs Barbara Apel, of the Mimosa pastoral property. She ran her husband's property alone during World War II.

References 

North Burnett Region
Localities in Queensland